Pullulan is a polysaccharide polymer consisting of maltotriose units, also known as α-1,4- ;α-1,6-glucan'.  Three glucose units in maltotriose are connected by an α-1,4 glycosidic bond, whereas consecutive maltotriose units are connected to each other by an α-1,6 glycosidic bond. Pullulan is produced from starch by the fungus Aureobasidium pullulans. Pullulan is mainly used by the cell to resist desiccation and predation. The presence of this polysaccharide also facilitates diffusion of molecules both into and out of the cell.
 
As an edible, mostly tasteless polymer, the chief commercial use of pullulan is in the manufacture of edible films that are used in various breath freshener or oral hygiene products such as Listerine Cool Mint of Johnson and Johnson (USA) and Meltz Super Thin Mints of Avery Bio-Tech Private Ltd. (India). Pullulan and HPMC can also be used as a vegetarian substitute for drug capsules, rather than gelatine. As a food additive, it is known by the E number E1204.

See also
Pullulanase
Desiccation

References 

 Characteristics of pullulan based edible films (abstract)
 Pullulan
 
 Pullulan chemical diagram

Biotechnology products
Food additives
Polysaccharides
Packaging materials
E-number additives

Further reading 

 Saman Zarei; Faramarz Khodaiyan; Seyed Saeid Hosseini; John F. Kennedy. (October 2020) "Pullulan Production Using Molasses and Corn Steep Liquor as Agroindustrial Wastes: Physiochemical, Thermal and Rheological Properties". Applied Food Biotechnology, Vol. 7 No. 4 (2020), 18 August 2020 , Page 263-272. https://doi.org/10.22037/afb.v7i4.29747